These are the Billboard magazine Hot Dance Club Play number one hits of 1984.

See also
1984 in music
List of number-one dance hits (United States)
List of artists who reached number one on the U.S. Dance chart

References

1984
1984 record charts
1984 in American music